This is a list of new-age music artists with articles on Wikipedia.

New-age music is broadly defined as relaxing, even "meditative", music that is primarily instrumental. Unlike relaxing forms of classical music, new-age music makes greater use of electronica and non-Western instrumentation. There is some debate on what can be considered "new-age music"; for example several musicians in Celtic music or Smooth jazz have expressed annoyance at being labeled "new-age musicians". For more on that debate, see the article on new-age music. In addition, several musicians object to the label because they fear it implies a connection to the New Age movement.

A 
 Philip Aaberg – pianist 
 William Ackerman – guitarist
 Acoustic Alchemy -band
 Paul Adams – guitarist and multi-instrumentalist
 Adiemus – band
 AeTopus – project by composer/producer Bryan Tewell Hughes
 Omar Akram – composer, pianist
 Azam Ali – singer, songwriter
 Alpha Wave Movement – composer, synthesizer music
 Amethystium – band
 Ancient Future – World music band
 Darol Anger – violinist, composer
 Romina Arena – vocals, composer, songwriter, producer, piano, violin, guitar
 David Arkenstone – composer
 Diane Arkenstone – composer, pianist, keyboardist
 Armik – flamenco guitarist
 James Asher – composer, percussionist
 Can Atilla – pianist, songwriter, violinist
 Australis – composer, producer
 Paul Avgerinos – composer, producer
 Ayana – singer, songwriter
 Sara Ayers

B 
 B-Tribe – a Spanish trio
 Emily Bear – pianist, composer
 Hennie Bekker – pianist, composer
 Benise – flamenco guitarist
 Thomas Bergersen – composer
 Daniel Berthiaume – composer, guitar and keyboards
 Biddu – vocalist, music producer
 Tim Blake – keyboardist
 Jo Blankenburg – composer, pianist
 Blue Stone – band
 Moya Brennan – composer, singer
 Thom Brennan – composer
 Jim Brickman – pianist
 Peter Buffett -pianist, composer
 Markus Burger – pianist, composer
 John Burke – pianist
 Richard Burmer – composer, keyboardist
 Ray Buttigieg – composer

C 
 Wendy Carlos – composer, keyboardist 
 Stephen Caudel – composer, guitarist, keyboardist, arranger
 Celtic Woman – band
 Ceredwen – duo 
 Sheila Chandra
 Craig Chaquico – guitarist
 Checkfield – duo, composer, guitarist, keyboardist
 Suzanne Ciani – composer, pianist
 Clannad – band
 Michael Colina – composer, producer, pianist, keyboardist, engineer
 Al Conti – composer, pianist, keyboardist
 Jesse Cook – flamenco guitarist
 Randy and Pamela Copus – duo known as 2002
 Corciolli – composer, musician
 Coyote Oldman – band
 Michael Cretu – composer, MIDI keyboard, guitar
 Cusco – band
 CFCF

D 
 Dadawa
 Scott D. Davis – pianist, composer
 Alex De Grassi – American Grammy Award-nominated fingerstyle guitarist
 Deep Forest – band
 Delerium
 Constance Demby – composer, multi-instrumentalist
 Deuter – composer, multi-instrumentalist
 Thomas Di Leva – singer, guitarist, keyboardist, harmonica, drummer, peace activist, composer
 Julius Dobos – composer
 Suzanne Doucet – composer, multi-instrumentalist
 Catherine Duc – composer, pianist/keyboardist
 Kyle Bobby Dunn – composer, arranger, performer
 Chinmaya Dunster – sarod

E 
 Ludovico Einaudi – composer, pianist
 Levente Egry – composer, pianist
 Elements – band consisting of ex members of the Pat Metheny Group
 Emerald Web – musical project
 Marc Enfroy – composer, songwriter
 Enigma – musical project by Michael Cretu
 Enya – singer, composer
 Era – musical project
 Erwilian – band
 Esteban
 Dean Evenson – flautist, keyboardist, composer
 Roger Evernden – composer, pianist

F 
 Ryan Farish – composer, multi-instrumentalist
 Larry Fast
 Alex Fox – flamenco guitarist
 Christopher Franke – keyboardist
 Eloy Fritsch – composer
 Edgar Froese – composer, guitarist, keyboardist
 Fortuna – singer-songwriter
 Michael Flatley

G 
 Gandalf – composer, multi-instrumentalist
 Jan Garbarek – composer, saxophonist
 Tim Gemmill – composer, multi-instrumentalist, producer 
 Michael Gettel – composer, pianist
 Lisa Gerrard – vocalist, composer, yangqinist
 Medwyn Goodall – multi-instrumentalist, composer, producer
 David & Steve Gordon – recording duo, producers
 Govi – composer, multi-instrumentalist
 Francis Goya – guitarist
 Gregorian – band
 Nicholas Gunn – flautist, multi-instrumentalist, recording artist, composer, producer

H 
 John Hackett – composer, flautist, member of Symbiosis
 Jean Ven Robert Hal – composer, synthesizer player, keyboardist
 Steven Halpern – Grammy-nominated recording artist and proponent of music therapy
 Paul Hardcastle – composer, synthesizer player, guitarist
 Michael Allen Harrison – composer, pianist, songwriter
 Fiona Joy Hawkins – pianist
 Michael Hedges – composer, guitarist
 Scott Helland – composer, guitarist
 Barbara Higbie – pianist, violinist, composer, singer, songwriter
 Steve Hillage
 Himekami
 Michael Hoppé – composer
 Paul Horn – flautist
 Yoshiaki Hoshi – composer, synthesizer player, and founder of the group Himekami

I 

 Iasos – composer, keyboardist, synthesizer player
 Ralf Illenberger – guitarist, keyboardist
 Mark Isham – composer, synthesist

J 
 Steve Jansen – composer, drummer, keyboardist
 Jean-Michel Jarre – composer
 Karl Jenkins – composer
 Theo Jörgensmann – composer, basset clarinetist
 Bradley Joseph – composer, pianist, keyboardist
 William Joseph – pianist, composer
 Prem Joshua – composer

K 
 Kerani – composer, arranger
 Karunesh – composer
 Peter Kater – composer, songwriter, pianist
 Kevin Kern – composer, pianist
 Al Gromer Khan – composer, sitar player
 Sandeep Khurana – composer, songwriter
 Kitarō – composer
 Bernward Koch – pianist, composer
 Kokin Gumi – music group
 Darlene Koldenhoven – vocalist, keyboardist, songwriter
 Tetsuya Komuro – composer, pianist
 Ron Korb – composer, flutist, songwriter
 Andrei Krylov – composer, guitarist, keyboardist, flutist

L 
 Lara & Reyes – flamenco guitarists
 Fariborz Lachini – composer, pianist
 David Lanz – composer, pianist
 Caroline Lavelle - cellist, composer
 Leah - singer, pianist, keyboardist, composer
 Nolwenn Leroy – singer, songwriter, multi-instrumentalist 
 Lesiëm – musical project by German producers Sven Meisel and Alex Wende
 Lia – singer, songwriter
 Ottmar Liebert – flamenco guitarist
 Lorie Line – composer, pianist
 Johannes Linstead – flamenco guitarist
 Helen Jane Long – composer, pianist
 Oscar Lopez – flamenco guitarist
 Ray Lynch – composer, musician, producer
 Lisa Lynne – composer, harpist

M 
 Mannheim Steamroller – group (leader: Chip Davis)
 Michael Manring – electric bassist, composer
 Catya Maré – songwriter, violinist
 Giovanni Marradi – pianist, composer
 Mars Lasar -German keyboardist and composer
 Vasco Martins – symphonic composer, pianist, guitarist, electronic keyboards
 Keiko Matsui – pianist
 Lyle Mays – composer, pianist
 Paul McCandless – composer, woodwind player
 Loreena McKennitt – singer, musician, composer, producer
 Stephan Micus – composer, multi-instrumentalist, singer
 Miten
 Mithoon – film composer
 Alain Morisod – pianist
 Mythos – Bob D'Eith (piano and producer) and Paul Schmidt (guitar)
 Robert ÆOLUS Myers – composer, performer, producer

N 
 Nightnoise
 Michael Nyman – composer

O 
 Patrick O'Hearn – keyboardist, composer
 Mike Oldfield – composer, guitarist
 Terry Oldfield – composer
 Opafire – musical project
 Oregon – ethnic jazz band (leaders: Ralph Towner and Paul McCandless)
 Thomas Otten

P 
 Jeff Pearce – guitar and Chapman Stick
 Deva Premal – musician, singer
 David Parsons – composer

Q

R 
 Raphael – ambient composer, musician 
 Jorge Reyes – Mexican ethnic fusions
 Laza Ristovski – keyboardist, composer
 Lawson Rollins – flamenco guitarist
 Ron Roy – producer, director, composer, arranger
 Rondò Veneziano – chamber orchestra
 Terje Rypdal – guitarist, composer
 Nancy Rumbel – ocarina, oboe, English horn, keyboards

S 
 Ryuichi Sakamoto – composer, pianist
 Jon Schmidt – pianist, composer 
 Klaus Schulze – keyboardist, composer, drummer
 Secret Garden – duo consisting of Fionnuala Sherry and Rolf Løvland
 SEAY – composer, recording artist, vocalist
 Jonn Serrie
 Shadowfax
 Shahin & Sepehr (Shahin Shahida and Sepehr Haddad) – flamenco guitarists
 Dechen Shak-Dagsay – vocalist
 Ananda Shankar – musician
 Oliver Shanti & Friends – band
 Rabbi Shergill – singer, songwriter, guitarist
 Yoko Shimomura – composer, pianist
 Michael Shrieve
 Singh Kaur – singer, composer
 Montana Skies – cello, guitar
 Snatam Kaur – singer, multi-instrumentalist
 Cadence Spalding – singer, composer
 Chris Spheeris – composer 
 Gary Stadler – recording artist
 Michael Stearns – composer, keyboardist
 Liz Story – pianist, composer
  Strunz & Farah (Jorge Strunz and Ardeshir Farah) – flamenco guitarists
 Andy Summers – composer, guitarist
 David Sylvian – composer, guitarist, keyboardist
 Symbiosis – band (UK)
 Dinesh Subasinghe – composer, violinist, ancient Ravanahatha performer, multi-instrumentalist
 Laura Sullivan – composer, pianist
 Sumanth – composer
 Stars Over Foy – composer, dj

T 
 Tangerine Dream – band
 Team Rockit – Swedish band
 Irv Teibel – field recordist, electronic musician
 John Tesh – pianist, composer
 The Piano Guys – band, piano and cello
 Jennifer Thomas – pianist, composer
 Robert Scott Thompson – composer, recording artist
 Tingstad and Rumbel 
 Isao Tomita – composer, keyboardist
 Toshi – vocalist, ex-lead singer of Japanese metal band X Japan
 Kathryn Toyama – composer, pianist

V 
 Vangelis – composer
 Luis Villegas – flamenco guitarist
 Ad Visser – Dutch composer
 Andreas Vollenweider – harpist, composer

W 
 Rick Wakeman – keyboardist, composer
 Billy Joe Walker, Jr. – guitarist
 Kit Watkins -keyboardist
 Wavestar – band 
 Hayley Westenra – vocals, piano, violin, guitar
 Chuck Wild – composer, keyboardist, producer of the Liquid Mind album series
 Stuart Wilde – producer, lyricist
 Willie and Lobo (Willie Royal and Wolfgang "Lobo" Fink) – flamenco duo (guitar & violin)
 George Winston – pianist
 Paul Winter – soprano saxophonist, composer
 Erik Wøllo – composer, guitarist
 Danny Wright – pianist
 David Wright – keyboardist, composer

Y 
 Akira Yamaoka – composer, producer
 Yanni – composer, pianist, keyboardist
 Yiruma – composer, pianist, producer
 Kim Yoon – pianist
 David Young – composer, flautist
 Young & Rollins – flamenco guitarists

Z 
 Gheorghe Zamfir – pan flute
 Zamora – composer, pianist/keyboardist
 Zingaia
 Ralph Zurmühle – composer, pianist

References

See also 
 New Flamenco

 
 
New Age musicians